"She's Going Home with Me" is a song written and recorded by American country music artist Travis Tritt.  It was released in April 1997 as the third single from the album The Restless Kind.  The song reached number 24 on the Billboard Hot Country Singles & Tracks chart.

Content
Tritt said in an article with Billboard that the song was an example of his personal involvement in The Restless Kind, as he co-produced it, played electric guitar on it, and sang his own harmony vocals.

Critical reception
A review of the single in the same magazine was favorable, saying that it "boasts an infectious, retro-spiced groove" and "has a driving feel, reminiscent of Johnny Rivers' 'Memphis''."

Chart performance

References

1997 singles
1996 songs
Travis Tritt songs
Songs written by Travis Tritt
Song recordings produced by Don Was
Warner Records singles